The 1971 Cork Senior Hurling Championship was the 83rd staging of the Cork Senior Hurling Championship since its establishment by the Cork County Board in 1887. The championship began on 25 April 1971 and ended on 3 October 1971.

University College Cork entered the championship as the defending champions, however, they were beaten by Passage in the second round.

The final was played on 3 October 1971 at the Athletic Grounds in Cork, between Blackrock and St. Finbvarr's, in what was their first meeting in the final in 42 years. Blackrock won the match by 2-19 to 5-04 to claim their 24th championship title overall and a first title in 10 years.

Blackrock's Pat Moylan was the championship's top scorer with 0-37.

Team changes

To Championship

Promoted from the Cork Intermediate Hurling Championship
 Cloyne

Results

First round

Second round

Quarter-finals

Semi-finals

Final

Championship statistics

Top scorers

Top scorers overall

Top scorers in a single game

References

Cork Senior Hurling Championship
Cork Senior Hurling Championship